Whitney Smith Jr. (February 26, 1940 – November 17, 2016) was an American professional vexillologist and scholar of flags. He originated the term vexillology, which refers to the scholarly analysis of all aspects of flags. He was a founder of several vexillology organizations. Smith was a Laureate and a Fellow of the International Federation of Vexillological Associations.

Early life and education
Whitney Smith Jr. was born on February 26, 1940, to Mildred and Whitney Smith. As a youth, he lived in Lexington and Winchester, Massachusetts. With Patriots' Day memories and a 1946 gift of The Golden Encyclopedia, Smith's interest in flags was started.

At Harvard, he studied political science and received a bachelor's degree in the field in 1961. During his time at Harvard, Smith designed the flag of Guyana. He received his doctorate in political science at Boston University in 1964; political symbolism was the subject of his dissertation.

Career

Smith had his first article published at age 18. By 1960, he was consulting with the Encyclopaedia Britannica.

In 1961, Smith and colleague Gerhard Grahl co-founded The Flag Bulletin, the world's first journal about flags. The following year, Smith established The Flag Research Center at his home and was its director.

Smith worked with Klaes Sierksma to organize the First International Congress of Vexillology (Muiderberg, Netherlands) in 1965. They joined Louis Mühlemann in founding the International League of Vexillologists and were members of its Governing Board on September 5, 1965, and operated until September 3, 1967. The league was replaced by the  International Federation of Vexillological Associations (known by its French acronym FIAV) with Smith as vice-president of the Provisional Council as of September 3, 1967. In 1969, Smith moved from being FIAV Provisional Council vice-president to being the first Secretary-General of FIAV. Smith was also responsible for founding the North American Vexillological Association (NAVA) and the Flag Heritage Foundation. On August 28, 1981, he was elected the second Secretary-General for Congresses, ending his multiple terms as FIAV Secretary-General. Smith served in that office until he returned to the FIAV Secretary-General position on September 29, 1983.

Smith quit his full-time professorship at Boston University in 1970. By 1985, he had written 19 books.

On July 5, 1991, Smith was named by the FIAV a Laureate of the Federation and left the office of FIAV Secretary-General. He was given the honor of Fellow of the Federation on July 27, 2001.

In 2006 he was the joint author of The American Flag: Two Centuries of Concord & Conflict

In 2013 he transferred The Flag Research Center's library and archives to The Dolph Briscoe Center for American History.

On November 17, 2016, Smith died from complications of Alzheimer's disease at the age of 76.

Bibliography
Smith wrote 27 books on the subject of flags, notably Flags Through the Ages and Across the World, The Flag Book of the United States, and Flag Lore of all Nations.

He was the designer of the national flag of Guyana, 21 Saudi Arabian navy flags and served as a vexillographer (flag designer) to a number of governments and organizations. In 1981, Smith was part of a committee that developed the flag of Bonaire and assisted in the design of the flag of Aruba.

Smith also wrote over 250 articles for the Encyclopædia Britannica.

See also
 Graham Bartram
 William Crampton
 Alfred Znamierowski
 Vexillological symbol

References

External links
 A Guide to the Dr. Whitney Smith Flag Research Center Collection at Dolph Briscoe Center for American History, The University of Texas at Austin
 The Flag Bulletin #234 In Memoriam: Whitney Smith

1940 births
2016 deaths
Boston University College of Arts and Sciences alumni
Boston University faculty
Harvard University alumni
People from Arlington, Massachusetts
People from Winchester, Massachusetts
Flag designers
Vexillologists
Writers from Massachusetts
Neurological disease deaths in Massachusetts
Deaths from Alzheimer's disease
Boston University alumni